Dhanmondi Lake is a lake located in the Dhanmondi residential area in Dhaka, Bangladesh. The lake was originally a dead channel of the Karwan Bazar River, and was connected to the Turag River. The lake is partially connected with the Begunbari Canal. In 1956, Dhanmondi was developed as a residential area. In the development plan, about 16% of the total area of Dhanmondi was designated for the lake.

Beginning from Jigatola (Dhanmondi Road # 2) the lake extends up to Road # 27 (new l6A), and bounded by the Mohammadpur-Lalmatia area in the north, Satmasjid Road in the west, BDR (bangladesh rifles) Gate (Dhanmondi Road # 2) in the south and in the east by Kalabagan residential area. It is 3 km in length, 35-100m in width, with a maximum depth of 4.77m and the total area of the water body is 37.37 ha. There is one box culvert in the lake near Sukrabad area, which is the only outlet of the lake. Excess floodwater due to heavy rainfall passes through this outlet. So water level in the lake remains almost the same in all seasons.

Gallery

References

Dhanmondi
Geography of Dhaka
Lakes of Bangladesh
Tourist attractions in Dhaka
Lakes in Dhaka city